Shanghai Biren Intelligent Technology Co. is a Chinese fabless semiconductor design company. The company was founded in 2019 by Lingjie Xu and others, all of whom were previously employed at NVIDIA or Alibaba. Biren has advertised two general-purpose graphics processing units (GPGPUs), the BR100 and BR104. Both cards are aimed at artificial intelligence and high-performance computing.

As a result of U.S sanctions effective in October 2022 regarding exportation of advanced computing devices and manufacturing materials, Biren's contracted semiconductor manufacturer Taiwan Semiconductor Manufacturing Company (TSMC) halted all manufacturing of the company's products. In an apparent effort to get around a stipulation of the U.S. sanctions, Biren reportedly modified their BR100 GPU to be able to process less data, so that it would not qualify for restriction for its manufacturer, TSMC.

See also
 CHIPS and Science Act
 Semiconductor industry in China

References

External links
 

Semiconductor companies of China
Electronics companies established in 2019
Graphics chips
Fabless semiconductor companies